William Varney Pettet (May 7, 1858 – June 21, 1938) was a farmer and political figure in Ontario, Canada. He represented Prince Edward in the House of Commons of Canada from 1896 to 1900 as a Patrons of Industry member.

He was born in West Lake, Prince Edward County, Canada West, the son of Daniel Pettet and Dorcas Young, and was educated in Picton and Belleville. In 1884, he married Mamie F. Morrison. He served on the council for Hallowell Township. Pettet ran unsuccessfully for reelection in 1900 as a Liberal candidate. He died in Picton at the age of 80.

References 

1858 births
1938 deaths
Members of the House of Commons of Canada from Ontario
Patrons of Industry MPs
People from Prince Edward County, Ontario